Pyrausta unifascialis, the one-banded pyrausta, is a moth in the family Crambidae. It was described by Alpheus Spring Packard in 1873. It is found in North America, where it has been recorded from Quebec west to British Columbia, south to Arizona and California. The habitat consists of forest openings, clearings and fields.

The wingspan is 16–24 mm. The forewings are brown with scattered black scales and a whitish S-shaped band in the subterminal area. The hindwings are dark grey with a white triangular discal patch. Adults are on wing from April to August.

The larvae are polyphagous. They have been recorded feeding on Antennaria, Phaseolus, Eriogonum and Gayophytum species.

Subspecies
Pyrausta unifascialis unifascialis (British Columbia, Rocky Mountains, California)
Pyrausta unifascialis arizonensis Munroe, 1957 (Arizona)
Pyrausta unifascialis rindgei Munroe, 1857 (southern California)
Pyrausta unifascialis subolivalis (Packard, 1873) (from Nova Scotia to Alberta, south to New Jersey, Pennsylvania, Illinois)

References

Moths described in 1873
unifascialis
Moths of North America